Crawford Township is one of the thirteen townships of Wyandot County, Ohio, United States.  The 2010 census found 4,789 people in the township, 3,674 of whom lived in the village of Carey.

Geography
Located in the northwestern part of the county, it borders the following townships:
Big Spring Township, Seneca County - north
Seneca Township, Seneca County - northeast corner
Tymochtee Township - east
Crane Township - southeast corner
Salem Township - south
Richland Township - southwest corner
Ridge Township - west
Biglick Township, Hancock County - northwest corner

The village of Carey is located in western Crawford Township.

Name and history
Statewide, the only other Crawford Township is located in Coshocton County.

Government
The township is governed by a three-member board of trustees, who are elected in November of odd-numbered years to a four-year term beginning on the following January 1. Two are elected in the year after the presidential election and one is elected in the year before it. There is also an elected township fiscal officer, who serves a four-year term beginning on April 1 of the year after the election, which is held in November of the year before the presidential election. Vacancies in the fiscal officership or on the board of trustees are filled by the remaining trustees.

References

External links
County website

Townships in Wyandot County, Ohio
Townships in Ohio